The KM131 Jeep, alternately K131 or KM420, is a light utility vehicle manufactured by Kia Motors in South Korea. The Kia KM131 Jeep was designed and developed by Asia Motors, and it started being delivered to the South Korean army in 1997 as the replacement for its predecessor, the KM111 Jeep. Its civilian version is known as the Kia Retona, and was sold between 1998 and 2003. The 42 series vehicles are 1/4 ton capacity and are available in various configurations, serving since 1997. A toy version is sold as part of a larger construction toy set sold by Oxford Toy in South Korea.

Operators

 
 
 : Chilean Marine Corps

See also
 Humvee
 Land Rover Wolf
 Land Rover Perentie
 G-Wagon
 Iveco LMV
 URO VAMTAC
 Honker
 Jeep J8
 AIL Storm
 Type 73
 UAZ-469
 BJ2022
 Marruá
 Tiuna
 Safir

References

External links

Kia vehicles
Military light utility vehicles
Compact sport utility vehicles
Mini sport utility vehicles